Albert Hammond (1974) is the third album by British singer, songwriter and music producer Albert Hammond. The album peaked at #3 on the Dutch albums chart and produced three singles which charted on the Hot 100.

Track listing
All tracks by Albert Hammond and Mike Hazlewood

"I'm a Train" – 3:22
"Everything I Want to Do" (new version) – 2:58
"Dime Queen of Nevada" – 3:55
"New York City Here I Come" – 3:06
"The Girl They Call the Cool Breeze" – 3:53
"Names, Tags, Numbers and Labels" (new version) – 2:45
"I Don't Wanna Die in an Air Disaster" – 3:40
"Half a Million Miles from Home" – 2:49
"Fountain Avenue" – 2:57
"We're Running Out" – 2:53
"Candle Light, Sweet Candle Light" – 2:31
"Mary Hot Lips Arizona" – 2:38

Personnel
Albert Hammond - guitar, vocals
Jay Lewis, Neal Schon, Larry Carlton - guitars
Tommy Tedesco - banjo
Larry Knechtel, Michael Omartian - piano
Bernie Krause - Moog synthesizer
Jim Hodgson - keyboards
Joe Osborn - bass
Hal Blaine, Jim Gordon - drums
Victor Feldman - vibraphone
Andy Narell - steel drums
Armando Peraza - bongos
Bill Green - alto saxophone
Sid Sharp - strings

Production
Produced by Albert Hammond and Roy Halee, except track 6 (Halee/Hammond/Don Altfield)
Recording and mix: Roy Halee; "Recordist": Mark Freedman 
Mastered by George Horn

References

1974 albums
Albert Hammond albums
Epic Records albums
Albums produced by Roy Halee